Barleria tetracantha is a species of plant in the family Acanthaceae. It is endemic to Yemen.  Its natural habitat is rocky areas.

References

Endemic flora of Socotra
tetracantha
Vulnerable plants
Taxonomy articles created by Polbot
Taxa named by Isaac Bayley Balfour